Ivan Tisci (born 22 March 1974 in Genoa) is an Italian footballer who plays as a midfielder.

Tisci has spent 9 seasons in Serie B and briefly also played in Serie A.

Career
In June 2004, Tisci joined Modena on free transfer.

After the relegation of Crotone from Serie B, he joined Foggia of Serie C1 in 1-year contract.

In August 2009, he was signed by Avellino which recently relegated to Serie D.

References

External links
Profile at Football.it 
Profile at La Gazzetta dello Sport 

Italian footballers
Genoa C.F.C. players
S.S. Virtus Lanciano 1924 players
Cosenza Calcio 1914 players
Delfino Pescara 1936 players
L.R. Vicenza players
U.S. Avellino 1912 players
Modena F.C. players
F.C. Crotone players
Calcio Foggia 1920 players
Serie A players
Association football midfielders
Footballers from Genoa
1974 births
Living people